Strzeżenice  is a village in the administrative district of Gmina Będzino, within Koszalin County, West Pomeranian Voivodeship, in north-western Poland.

Notable residents
 Paul Dahlke (1904-1984), German actor

References

Villages in Koszalin County